Chhota Bheem and the Curse of Damyaan is a 2012 Indian computer-animated fantasy action adventure film written and directed by Rajiv Chilaka, based on the character Chhota Bheem and his friends. It is the eleventh movie in the Chhota Bheem film series and the first movie to be released in theatres. The film was made under the Green Gold Animation banner in association with INOX Cinemas and distributed by PVR Pictures worldwide.

Plot 
In Dholakpur, Princess Indumati and a few other children are kidnapped by Mangal Singh. Chhota Bheem aka arrives and saves the children Meanwhile, Jaggu, Dholu-Bholu, Raju, Chutki and Kalia are planning their Bheem's secret birthday party while Damyaan, a demon who was granted immortality by the Book of Magi along with a curse that he would be confined to the city of Sonapur, wants to escape from this confinement and get back his power and kingdom. Damyaan's minister, Skandi hijacks and loots trade convoy headed for Dholakpur and meets King Indravarma, who assigned the delivery of the convoy. Bheem suspects Skandi and the rest of his gang, before he can speak to Indravarma, Skandi reveals about the depleting treasury of Dholakpur and the hidden treasures of Sonapur, thus luring him. In reality, he wants to trick Indravarma to release Damyaan. Indravarma agrees to leave for the city in search of that hidden treasure. Despite being warned by the gypsies, he begins the journey, along with Bheem and his friends. After reaching the city, the king unknowingly sets Damyaan free through the great demon entrance.

Damyaan captures the king, along with Bheem and his friends in the prison. Bheem manages to set his friends free through his wit and strength, where he meets Singhala, who reveals that the only way to free the prisoners from Damyaan's capture is defeating Damyaan by destroying the Book of Magi. Singhala sends them back in time where the while trying to find the Book of Magi. A fight ensues, in which Dholu-Bholu are turned into frogs. Bheem somehow manages to defeat the guards and dons their clothes along with his friends and enters Sonapur pretending to be a bunch of Kaalsainiks. Soon another group of Kaalsainiks arrive and a sweet shop owner named Gulabchand figures out that Bheem and his team are not Kaalsainiks and manages to save the group. In the process, Bheem is wounded and faints while passing through the magical door. Upon regaining consciousness, he observes that Dholu-Bholu have regained their respective human forms. The sage who saves them, Guru Sambhu, tells them that despite being brave and strong, they cannot defeat Damyaan without magic. He then takes them to a magical place and  teaches magic to the group. After completing their class on magic, he provides them with powers: Raju gets a magical bow and arrow which never misses its aim; Chutki gets two magical trees; Jaggu gets a bunch of magical stinging bananas; Kalia gets the power to become invisible; Dholu and Bholu get the power to replicate themselves and Bheem gets an hymn to seize the power of the enemy which was not decoded till date.

At night, they hear sounds of fireworks and celebrations, which are of the end of the second term of Damyaan's Kaalkriya , which involves trapping ghosts for their powers in three different rings in three terms by using the hymns given the Book of Magi. Bheem and his team are teleported to Damyaan's palace. Using their powers, they manage to seize the first ring, but while seizing the second ring, Kalia activates a trap which covers them in a strange gas. Upon recovering, Damyaan tells Bheem that his birthday gift will be- watching his friends die. In an instant, Bheem decodes the hymn and releases his friends. They fight and defeat the Kaalsainiks while Bheem defeats Damyaan in a fight without magic, seeks to rule the world. Bheem eventually thrashes Damyaan and kills him where he and his friends return to the future to Dholakpur, only to realise that the whole of Dholakpur has fixed a party for Bheem.

Filming 
The animation series Chhota Bheem was launched in 2008. After the huge success of the series Indian animation content producer Green Gold Animation in association with PVR Pictures decided to make a full-length feature film on Chhota Bheem. The movie was directed by Rajiv Chilaka. Animation director of the film was Owell Mina and the music of the film was composed by Sunil Kaushik. The Animation Of movie was started in Green Gold Animation Studio, Hyderabad in June 2011 and they finished it in January 2012.

Sequel 
Green Gold animation have launched its sequel Chhota Bheem and The Rise of Damyaan which premiered on 27 October 2019 on Pogo TV.The movie was animated From first Navratras to August 2019.

Release and reception 
The film released on 18 May 2012 and got a surprise success.

It received lukewarm reviews.

See also
Indian animation industry
List of Indian animated feature films

References

External links
 
 Official trailer at the official website

Indian animated films
2012 animated films
2012 films
Animated films based on animated series
Films based on television series
Chhota Bheem
Indian children's films
2010s Hindi-language films
English-language Indian films
2012 multilingual films
Indian multilingual films
Indian animated fantasy films